Mohamed Bangoura, is a Guinean drummer based in Sydney. His album Djembe Kan was nominated for the 2004 ARIA Award for Best World Music Album.

Discography

Albums

Awards and nominations

ARIA Music Awards
The ARIA Music Awards is an annual awards ceremony that recognises excellence, innovation, and achievement across all genres of Australian music. They commenced in 1987.

! 
|-
| 2004
| Djembe Kan 
| ARIA Award for Best World Music Album
| 
| 
|-

References

Living people
Year of birth missing (living people)
Guinean musicians